Samantha Martin & Delta Sugar are an eleven-piece band from Toronto, Canada, who are known for their blend of blues, soul, gospel and rock, and exceptional vocals.

History 
Samantha Martin formed the soul and blues focused band "Samantha Martin & Delta Sugar" in 2014. The band's debut record Send the Nightingale was released in 2015. The newly formed band's name comes from Martin’s love of southern blues traditions. The songs on Send the Nightingale reflected difficult times for Martin, whose mother was terminally ill at the time she was recording her album.

Send the Nightingale earned them four nominations at 2015 Maple Blues Awards, including Best Female Vocalist, Best Songwriter, Best New Group, and Best New Album/Producer.

In 2018, Samantha Martin & Delta Sugar signed a record deal with Gypsy Soul Records based out of Toronto. Their record Run to Me was released on April 28, 2018. Eleven months after releasing their recording Run to Me, the 11-piece blues/soul band was nominated for a Juno Award for Blues Album of the Year. Run to Me also garnered four Maple Blues Awards nominations.

Discography 
Albums

References

External links 
 
 
 

Canadian contemporary R&B musical groups
Canadian soul music groups
Canadian blues musical groups
Musical groups from Toronto